Benjamin Flanagan (born 11 January 1995) is a Canadian middle and long-distance runner. Flanagan is currently the Canadian record holder in the 10 km and 20 km road races. He commonly goes by the name "Ben".

High school career
On the track he was second in the 2000m run at the 2010 Canadian Youth Nationals. The next year while competing in the 3000m he had another second-place finish at Canadian Youth Nationals which got him selected to represent Canada at the 2011 IAAF World Youth Championships in Lille, France where he placed 16th in the 1500m.

College career
Flanagan attended The University of Michigan in Anna Arbor, Michigan. While there, he was coached by three-time Olympian and fellow Canadian Kevin Sullivan. Flanagan was the Big Ten 10,000m champion in 2016 and 2018, the 2017 NCAA Great Lake Regional Cross Country champion, and won the 2018 NCAA Outdoor Championships 10,000m by running 28:34.53 and passing Vincent Kiprop of Alabama in the final second.

Professional career
On September 4, 2018, he tweeted that he was joining Reebok Boston Track Club to be coached under Coach Chris John Fox. On January 12, 2022, he announced on Instagram that he was leaving the Reebok Boston Track Club. The next week, in another Instagram post he announced that had signed a contract with On and was moving back to Ann Arbor to train with the Very Nice Track Club under coach Ron Warhurst.

On October 23, 2022, Flanagan competed in the Valencia Half Marathon. While he only finished 18th overall, he beat fellow Canadian Cam Levins by 4 seconds becoming the new Canadian Half Marathon Record holder with a time of 1:01:00.

Ben is a three-time winner of the Falmouth Road Race, and has also won the Manchester Road Race.

Personal bests
Information from World Athletics profile.

Personal life
Ben is the son of Ron and Michelle Flanagan. He has two sisters, Kristen and Jamie.

Flanagan met his fiancé when his host family for the Falmouth road race got a flat tire causing him to stay the night with the president of the race, who's daughter happened to also attend the University of Michigan. After dating for three years the two got engaged.

See also
 List of Canadian records in athletics

References

External links
 Benjam Flannigan at World Athletics

Track and field athletes from Ontario
Canadian male long-distance runners
University of Michigan alumni
Michigan Wolverines athletes
Michigan Wolverines men's track and field athletes
1995 births
Living people